The 2012–13 Men's FIH Hockey World League Round 1 was held from August to December 2012. A total of 35 teams competing in 9 events were part in this round of the tournament playing for 13 berths in the Round 2, played from February to June 2013.

Qualification
Each national association member of the International Hockey Federation (FIH) had the opportunity to compete in the tournament. Teams ranked 17th and lower in the FIH World Rankings current at the time of seeking entries for the competition were allocated to one of the Round 1 events. The following 35 teams, shown with final pre-tournament rankings, competed in this round of the tournament.

 (21)
 (38)
 (40)
 (47)
 (31)
 (25)
 (22)
 ( 24)
 (71)
 (37)
 (43)

 (49)
 (15)
 (28)
 (30)
 (60)
 (70)
 (36)
 (73)
 (19)
 (50)

 (23)
 (32)
 (46)
 (35)
 (59)
 (34)
 (55)
 (26)
 (27)

 (57)
 (29)

Prague
Prague, Czech Republic, 17–19 August 2012.

Pool
All times are Central European Summer Time (UTC+02:00)

 Advanced to Round 2

Awards
Best Player:  Artem Ozerskyy
Fair Play:

Singapore
Singapore, 31 August–2 September 2012.

Pool
All times are Singapore Standard Time (UTC+08:00)

 Advanced to Round 2

Awards
Best Player:  Saifulnizam Md Seftu
Best Goalkeeper:  Authachai Soh-Tree

Accra
Accra, Ghana, 7–9 September 2012.

Pool
All times are Greenwich Mean Time (UTC±00:00)

 Advanced to Round 2

Cardiff
Cardiff, Wales, 7–9 September 2012.

Pool
All times are British Summer Time (UTC+01:00)

 Advanced to Round 2

Lousada
Lousada, Portugal, 25–30 September 2012.

Pool
All times are Western European Summer Time (UTC+01:00)

 Advanced to Round 2

1 Match was suspended at half time because of bad weather. The final 35 minutes were played on Friday, 28 September 2012 at 11:00 local time.

Port of Spain
Port of Spain, Trinidad and Tobago, 14–17 November 2012.

Pool
All times are Atlantic Standard Time (UTC−04:00)

 Advanced to Round 2

Chula Vista
Chula Vista, United States, 16–18 November 2012.

Pool
All times are Pacific Standard Time (UTC−:00)

 Advanced to Round 2

Doha
Doha, Qatar, 27 November–2 December 2012.

Pool
All times are Arabia Standard Time (UTC+03:00)

 Advanced to Round 2
 Disqualified

–Qatar's results were officially deleted from the event due to an eligibility problem with some of its players.

Suva
Suva, Fiji, 8–15 December 2012.

Pool
All times are Fiji Summer Time (UTC+13:00)

 Advanced to Round 2

References

External links
Official website (Prague)
Official website (Singapore)
Official website (Cardiff)
Official website (Accra)
Official website (Lousada)
Official website (Port of Spain)
Official website (Chula Vista)
Official website (Doha)
Official website (Suva)

Round 1